Jack Crawford and Elizabeth Ryan were the defending champions, but did not participate.

George Lott and Anna Harper defeated Ian Collins and Joan Ridley in the final, 6–3, 1–6, 6–1 to win the mixed doubles tennis title at the 1931 Wimbledon Championships.

Seeds

  Henri Cochet /  Eileen Fearnley-Whittingstall (fourth round)
  Pat Spence /  Betty Nuthall (semifinals)
  Vernon Kirby /  Josane Sigart (quarterfinals)
  Pat Hughes /  Ermyntrude Harvey (fourth round)

Draw

Finals

Top half

Section 1

Section 2

Section 3

Section 4

Bottom half

Section 5

Section 6

Section 7

Section 8

The nationality of Miss Partner is unknown.

References

External links

X=Mixed Doubles
Wimbledon Championship by year – Mixed doubles